Graven image or graven images may refer to:
 Idolatry, a pejorative term for the worship of an idol
Thou shalt not make unto thee any graven image, one of the Ten Commandments

Music
 Graven Image (album), a 1994 album by Jandek
 "Graven Image", a song by Bolt Thrower from the 1994 album ...For Victory
 "Graven Image", a song by Dead to Fall from the 2002 album Everything I Touch Falls To Pieces
 "Graven Image", a 1983 song by Deep Wound
 "Graven Image", a song by Shinjuku Thief from the 1991 album Bloody Tourist 
 "Gravenimage", a song by Sonata Arctica from the 2003 album Winterheart's Guild

Publications
 Graven Images (book), a children's book written by Paul Fleischman
 Graven Image, a 1923 book by U.S. writer Margaret Widdemer
 "Graven Image" a story by U.S. writer E. Hoffmann Price from the 1967 book Strange Gateways
 Graven Images: Religion in Comic Books and Graphic Novels, a 2010 collection of essays edited by A. David Lewis and Christine Hoff Kraemer
 Graven Image, a 2011 novella by British writer Charlie Williams
 Graven Images, a 2011 novel written by astronomer Ray Norris